The 2017 World Junior Figure Skating Championships were held March 15–19, 2017 in Taipei City, Taiwan (Chinese Taipei). Commonly called "World Juniors" and "Junior Worlds", the event determined the World Junior champions in the disciplines of men's singles, ladies' singles, pair skating, and ice dancing.

Pair champions Ekaterina Alexandrovskaya / Harley Windsor became the first skaters representing Australia to win gold at an ISU Figure Skating Championships. The United States received gold in two disciplines, with Vincent Zhou winning the men's singles title and Rachel Parsons / Michael Parsons taking the ice dancing title. Russia's Alina Zagitova won the ladies' title in her first appearance at the event.

Records

The following new junior records were set during this competition:

Qualification
Skaters from all ISU member nations were eligible for the competition if they were at least 13 years old but not 19—or 21 for male pair skaters and ice dancers—before 1 July 2016 in their place of birth. National associations select their entries according to their own criteria but the ISU mandates that their selections achieve a minimum technical elements score (TES) at an international event prior to the World Junior Championships.

The term "Junior" in ISU competition refers to age, not skill level. Skaters may remain age-eligible for Junior Worlds even after competing nationally and internationally at the senior level. At junior events, the ISU requires that all programs conform to junior-specific rules regarding program length, jumping passes, types of elements, etc.

Minimum TES

Number of entries per discipline
Based on the results of the 2016 World Junior Championships, the ISU allowed each country one to three entries per discipline.

Schedule

Entries
Some member nations announced their selections in January or early February 2017. The International Skating Union published the full list of entries on 24 February 2017.

Changes to initial assignments

Results

Men
Vincent Zhou set a new junior world record for the free skating (179.24 points) and for the combined total (258.11 points). Daniel Samohin set a new junior world record for the free skating (165.63 points) but the record was later broken by Zhou.

Ladies
Alina Zagitova set a new junior world record for the free skating (138.02 points) and for the combined total (208.60 points).

Pairs
Alexandrovskaya/Windsor won Australia's first Junior Worlds medal in 41 years — since 1976, when Elizabeth Cain / Peter Cain took the pairs' bronze medal. They also became the first skaters representing Australia to receive gold at an ISU Figure Skating Championships.

Ice dancing
Rachel and Michael Parsons set a new junior world record for the free dance (97.54 points) and for the combined total (164.83 points). Alla Loboda and Pavel Drozd set a new junior world record for the combined total (164.37 points) but the record was later broken by Parsons/Parsons.

Medals summary

Medalists
Medals for overall placement:

Small medals for placement in the short segment:

Small medals for placement in the free segment:

By country
Table of medals for overall placement:

Table of small medals for placement in the short segment:

Table of small medals for placement in the free segment:

References

External links
 
 2017 World Junior Championships at the International Skating Union
http://www.isuresults.com/results/season1617/wjc2017/index.htm

World Junior Figure Skating Championships
World Junior Figure Skating Championships, 2017
International figure skating competitions hosted by Taiwan
2017 in Taiwanese sport
Sports competitions in Taipei
March 2017 sports events in Asia